Halemaumau (six syllables: HAH-lay-MAH-oo-MAH-oo) is a pit crater within the much larger Kīlauea Caldera at the summit of Kīlauea volcano on island of Hawaiʻi. The roughly circular crater was  x  before collapses that roughly doubled the size of the crater after May 3, 2018. Halemaumau is home to Pele, goddess of fire and volcanoes, according to the traditions of Hawaiian religion. Halemaʻumaʻu means "house of the āmau fern".

Halemaumau contained an active lava lake for much of the time before 1924, and was the site of several eruptions during the 20th century.  The crater again contained an active lava lake between 2008 and 2018, with the level of the lava usually fluctuating between 20 and 150 meters below Halemaumau's crater floor, though at times the lava lake rose high enough to spill onto crater floor. The lava lake drained away in May 2018 as new volcanic vents opened in lower Puna. The subsidence of the lava lake was accompanied by a period of explosions, earthquakes, large clouds of ash and toxic gas, and finally a gradual collapse of the summit caldera around Halemaumau. The collapse events ceased abruptly on August 2, 2018.

A small water pond appeared in Halemaumau in the summer of 2019. A new eruption began at 9:30 PM local time on December 20, 2020, completely boiling away the water lake and partially refilling the crater with lava. The eruption created a lava lake which lasted until May 23, 2021. The eruption was declared over 3 days later, on May 26, 2021. The most recent eruption began on September 29, 2021 and lasted until December 9, 2022.

Geological history – 1823 to 2008

1823 to 1894: Caldera lava lake and formation of Halemaumau 

William Ellis, a British missionary and amateur ethnographer and geologist, published the first English description of Kīlauea Caldera as it appeared in 1823. Ellis observed a large lake of molten lava:

From the time Ellis made his observations in 1823 (and likely some time before that as well) through 1840, a lava lake was present within a broad region of Kīlauea Caldera. Between 1840 and 1894, the size of the lava lake gradually got smaller, becoming localized near the present site of Halemaumau.

In 1866, Mark Twain, an American humorist, satirist, lecturer, and writer hiked to the Caldera floor. He wrote the following account of the lake of molten lava which he found there:

Following an earthquake swarm in December 1894, the lava lake fully drained away from Kīlauea's summit, ending the decades-long period of nearly continuous activity.

1906 to 1924: Reemergence of lava lake and explosive eruption 

By the end of 1906, the lava lake was again present nearly all of the time. At the time geologist Thomas Jaggar opened the Hawaiian Volcano Observatory in 1912, Halemaumau was nearly full with active lava.

Beginning during the night of May 9–10, 1924, a period of explosive eruptions took place at Halemaumau. In the community of Glenwood,  from Halemaumau, gutters on the roof of a store collapsed due to the weight of muddy ash. The explosive blasts also ejected rocks out of Halemaumau, some as large as 14 tons. One person was killed during an explosion on May 18 after being crushed by falling debris. The explosions continued for two and a half weeks, finally ceasing on May 27.

Halemaumau's more than doubled in size during the eruption.

1924 to 1982: Short-lived eruptions partially fill Halemaumau 
After the 1924 events, seven eruptions occurred within Halemaumau between 1924 and 1934, partly refilling the crater. Following the 1934 eruption, Halemaumau was relatively quiet until 1952, when a six-month long eruption took place. Subsequent eruptions in the 1950s, 1960s, and 1970s partially refilled the crater. A 1982 eruption covered a small portion of the northeastern crater floor.

2008 to 2018 eruptive activity

Beginning of the eruption

Halemaumau was quiet for 25 years after the 1982 eruption, with eruptive activity at Kīlauea being focused on the volcano's east rift zone beginning in 1983. However, Hawaiian Volcano Observatory scientists observed a gradual increase in activity beginning in late 2007, including an increase in sulfur dioxide emissions and an increase in seismic tremor. By March 2008, these parameters were several times higher than normal.

Crater activity began to increase when between March 10 and March 14, 2008, gas began to vent from the east wall fumarole directly below the Crater Overlook. At 02:58 am HST on March 19, 2008, HVO personnel recorded seismic events, and sunrise revealed a 20–30 meter (65–100 foot) diameter hole blown in the side where the vent once was; the explosion scattered debris and spatter across  and damaged the Crater Overlook. This was the first explosive eruption of Halemaumau since 1924, and the first lava eruption from the crater since 1982. The new crater formed in the explosion was informally named "Overlook Crater" by Hawaiian Volcano Observatory staff.

Sulfur dioxide gas emissions increased rapidly at the beginning of the episode. On March 13, HVO recorded a rate of 2,000 tons/day, the highest rate since measurements began in 1979. A concentration of over 40 ppm on Crater Rim Drive was measured, prompting alerts and other public safety measures. Halemaumau continued to intermittently emit high levels of volcanic gases, ash, spatter, Pele's Tears, and Pele's Hair until the second episode.

In response to the second episode, scientists and local government officials on April 9, 2008, ordered hundreds of people to evacuate from the Park and nearby villages because the sulfur dioxide concentration levels had reached a critical level and a hazardous vog plume extended downwind from the crater. The evacuation lasted two days.

On April 16, 2008, a third significant explosive event occurred at Halemaumau, spreading ash and debris throughout the area. Subsequently, a second evacuation of the park and surrounding areas was ordered on April 23, 2008.

Activity continued through the next few months, with Halemaumau continuing to emit a plume of ash and gases. A fourth explosive event occurred on August 1, 2008, and a fifth on August 27, 2008.

September 2008: Lava lake becomes visible

A Hawaii Volcano Observatory news release and images dated September 5, 2008 confirmed the first recorded images of a lava lake 130 feet below the lip of the Overlook Crater. The HVO had alluded to the presence of lava within the vent, including the sporadic ejecting of lava materials from the vent due to explosive episodes, but this gave officials the first opportunity to visually confirm that active lava was present. The report also noted that the lava could not be seen from observation points around the crater.

September 2008 to April 2018: Sustained lava lake

The lava lake within Halemaumau's Overlook Crater vent was visible nearly continuous from March 2008 until May 2018. During the period, the Overlook Crater slowly enlarged. The height of the lava lake fluctuated.

For three years from 2015 to 2018 the lava lake level remained close to the rim, with a further minor overflow event in October 2016 and a significant one in April 2018 that covered a majority of the crater floor in new lava.

In April 2018, a significant series of overflows had reportedly covered most of the Halemaʻumaʻu crater floor with new lava.

April to July 2018: Drainage of lava lake and the collapse of the summit caldera 

On April 30, the Puʻu ʻŌʻō crater on Kīlauea's east rift zone collapsed. Several days later, lava began to emerge from fissures on the lower east rift zone in Leilani Estates. On May 1, concurrent with the shift of activity on Kīlauea's east rift zone, the summit lava lake within Halemaumau's Overlook Crater began to drop; the US Geological Survey's status update on the evening of May 6 reported that Halemaumau's Overlook Crater lava lake had dropped by  since April 30. By May 10, the lava lake was no longer visible. Geologists believed that the draining of the lava lake was driven by a steady withdrawal of magma from Kīlauea's summit to feed the eruption on the volcano's lower east rift zone. Several small explosive events occurred between May 16 and May 26, ejecting ash and small blocks within a few hundred meters of the vent.

Beginning near the end of May, the floor of Kīlauea Caldera around Halemaumau began to subside in a series of 62 separate collapse events. At each collapse event the floor of the caldera dropped several meters and there was a magnitude 5.2 to 5.4 earthquake. Between each collapse event, an escalating swarm of earthquakes would occur. Notably, more than 700 earthquakes of a magnitude 4.0 or higher occurred each day during the collapse period. The collapse events enlarged and deepened Halemaumau. During the collapse, the former Halemaumau overlook and its parking lot were lost when segments of the crater rim slumped into the crater. The summit collapse events ceased abruptly on August 2, 2018, two days before the eruptive activity on Kīlauea's east rift zone decreased significantly.

2019–20 water lake

In late July 2019, helicopter pilots reported seeing a green pond of water at the bottom of the much-deepened Halema'uma'u crater. Geologists from the Hawaiian Volcano Observatory confirmed the presence of water during a helicopter fly-over on August 1, 2019.

Hawaiian Volcano Observatory scientists believe that the lake formed because the 2018 collapse events caused by the floor of Halemaʻumaʻu to collapse below the level of the local water table. The scientists suspect that the water table likely collapsed along with the rest of the crater but began to recover elevation after the collapse. Because the bottom of Halemaʻumaʻu was believed to be roughly  lower than level of the area water table after the collapse, water was able to inundate the crater floor as it rose. The lake marked the first time in recorded history that liquid water appeared in Halemaʻumaʻu crater in the form of a crater lake, though the US Geological Survey noted that at least one other small pond, thought to mark a body of perched water trapped by dikes, was present in the caldera just north of Halemaʻumaʻu prior to the caldera's collapse in 2018.

2020–21 eruption 
On December 20, 2020, at 9:30 PM local time, an eruption broke out within Halemaʻumaʻu. The US Geological Survey's Hawaiian Volcano Observatory reported that three vents were feeding lava into the bottom of Halemaʻumaʻu Crater, boiling off the water lake that had been growing since summer 2019 and replacing it with a lava lake. The observatory reported that the eruption created a plume that reached 30,000 feet in elevation. The eruption had been preceded by earthquake swarms centered under Kīlauea Caldera on November 30, 2020, and December 2, 2020, the second of which was interpreted as a small intrusion of magma.

County emergency officials reported that the eruption had stabilized by the following morning and that two of the three vents remained active and continued to fill the floor of Halemaʻumaʻu with lava.

On May 26, 2021, the Hawaiian Volcano Observatory announced in a daily update that Kīlauea was no longer erupting. Lava supply to the lava lake appeared to have ceased between May 11 and May 13, and the lava lake had completely crusted over by May 20. The last surface activity in Halemaʻumaʻu was observed on May 23.

2021–22 eruption
The Hawaiian Volcano Observatory began to record increased earthquake activity and changes in ground deformation patterns at Kīlauea's summit at about noon local time on September 29, 2021. An eruption began at 3:20 p.m. local time when several fissures opened within Halemaʻumaʻu crater in Kīlauea's summit caldera.

The eruption continued until December 9, 2022, when lava supply to the active lava lake ceased and the lake surface crusted over. On December 13, 2022, the Hawaiian Volcano Observatory determined that the eruption had ended. Over the course of the eruption,  of lava had been effused, and the floor of Halemaʻumaʻu had risen , since the beginning of the eruption on September 29, 2021.

2023 eruption
On January 5, 2023, the Hawaiian Volcano Observatory reported that Kīlauea began erupting within Halema‘uma‘u at approximately 4:34 p.m. HST. Fountain of up to 50 meters (164 feet) high were reported. New lava flows have inundated much of the crater floor and by 7:30 p.m. about 10 meters (32 feet) depth of new lava had been added to the crater floor.

Gallery

References

External links
U.S. Geological Survey Kilauea update page

Kīlauea
Hawaiʻi Volcanoes National Park
Volcanic craters
Articles containing video clips
Former lakes of the United States